''All Thats fifth season''' ran from December 12, 1998, to October 23, 1999. The season contained 23 episodes with a 100th episode at the end of the season.

Longtime cast member Lori Beth Denberg left the series at the end of the previous season. Danny Tamberelli succeeded her in the Vital Information sketch, and Tamberelli was given a new set and a new desk unlike that of Denberg's Vital Information.

Featured cast members Victor Cohn-Lopez and Zach Mclemore were both dropped from the show; producers then hired Nick Cannon and Mark Saul. This would be the final season for Kel Mitchell and Kenan Thompson.

Cast

Repertory players
 Amanda Bynes
 Leon Frierson
 Christy Knowings
 Kel Mitchell (final episode: October 16, 1999)
 Josh Server
 Danny Tamberelli
 Kenan Thompson 

Notes

Featured players
 Nick Cannon
 Mark Saul (first episode: December 19, 1998)

Episodes

References

1998 American television seasons
1999 American television seasons
All That seasons